Melissa S. May is the presiding judge of the 4th District of the Indiana Court of Appeals.  She was appointed to the Court of Appeals by Indiana Governor Frank O'Bannon in 1998.

May has a bachelor's degree from Indiana University South Bend and a law degree from Indiana University Law School, Indianapolis.

Sources
Judicial bio of May

Living people
Indiana state court judges
American women judges
People from Elkhart, Indiana
Year of birth missing (living people)
Indiana University–Purdue University Indianapolis alumni
Indiana University Robert H. McKinney School of Law alumni